This is a list of all lighthouses in the U.S. state of Maine as identified by the United States Coast Guard. There are fifty-seven active lights in the state, two of which are maintained as private aids; nine are standing but inactive, and three have been destroyed, one of which has been replaced by a skeleton tower. This includes two stations which originally featured twin towers; in both cases both towers survive but only one of each pair is active.

The Portland Head Light, first lit in 1791, is the oldest light in the state and was the first US lighthouse completed after independence from Britain. The last lighthouse in the state, the second Whitlocks Mill Light, was first lit in 1910; it is also the most northerly light in the state and therefore on the US Atlantic Coast. The West Quoddy Head Light sits on the easternmost point of the continental United States.

Lighthouse preservation in Maine has been facilitated by the Maine Lighthouse Program, which arose in the aftermath of the Rockland-based Island Institute's successful but protracted negotiations to acquire the keeper's house of the Heron Neck Light Station. A program for facilitating transfers was proposed by Peter Ralston of the institute, and legislation was first introduced by George J. Mitchell; a subsequent bill submitted by Olympia Snowe in 1995 met with greater success and was signed into law late in 1996 as part of the coast guard authorization act. Under the program, thirty-six light stations were offered to qualified preservation and historical groups and local governments; applications for transfer were reviewed by a board set up at the state level, headed by Richard I. Rybacki, a retired USCG rear admiral. Four lights were to be transferred to the US Fish and Wildlife; twenty-eight other lights were transferred in the summer of 1998. Prior to this program, some lights in the state had already been sold to individuals following deactivation in the 1930s. The most notable of these is the Tenants Harbor Light, which was purchased by Andrew Wyeth in 1978.

If not otherwise noted, focal height and coordinates are taken from the United States Coast Guard Light List, while location and dates of activation, automation, and deactivation are taken from the United States Coast Guard Historical information site for lighthouses.

Lighthouses

References 

Maine
 
Lighthouses
Lighthouses